Baharagora College, established in 1969, is a general degree college in the East Singhbhum district. It offers undergraduate and postgraduate courses in arts, commerce and sciences. It is affiliated to  Kolhan University.

Location
The college is located in tri-junction of the border of Jharkhand, West Bengal & Odisha states.

Departments

Science
Chemistry 
Physics 
Mathematics

Arts and Commerce
Odia
Hindi
English
History
Santali
Political Science
Economics
Philosophy
Education
Commerce
Bengali

See also

References

External links
 Baharagora College
 http://www.facebook.com/baharagoracollege

Colleges affiliated to Kolhan University
Universities and colleges in Jharkhand
East Singhbhum district
Educational institutions established in 1969